Joseph Atley (born 4 August 1998) is a professional Australian rules footballer playing for the Port Adelaide Football Club in the Australian Football League (AFL). He was drafted by Port Adelaide with their third selection and thirty-second overall in the 2016 national draft. He made his debut in the thirty-two point win against  at Domain Stadium in round sixteen of the 2017 season. Joe is the brother of Shaun Atley, who plays for the North Melbourne.

References

External links

 

1998 births
Living people
Port Adelaide Football Club players
Port Adelaide Football Club players (all competitions)
Bendigo Pioneers players
Australian rules footballers from Victoria (Australia)